The Lyman Reserve is a  nature reserve in Bourne, Plymouth and Wareham, Massachusetts and is managed by the Trustees of Reservations. The area was formerly as private fishing camp, which sits at the mouth of Red Brook at Buttermilk Bay. It is home to one of the last remaining groups of sea-run brook trout ("salters") in the Eastern United States.

Red Brook was established as a preserve in 2001.

References

External links 
 The Trustees of Reservations: Lyman Reserve
 Trail map

The Trustees of Reservations
Open space reserves of Massachusetts
Protected areas of Plymouth County, Massachusetts
2001 establishments in Massachusetts
Protected areas established in 2001